Pęczniew  is a village in Poddębice County, Łódź Voivodeship, in central Poland. It is the seat of the gmina (administrative district) called Gmina Pęczniew.

The village has a population of 830.

References

Villages in Poddębice County
Kalisz Governorate
Łódź Voivodeship (1919–1939)
Poznań Voivodeship (1921–1939)